Jan Bake (1 September 1787 – 26 March 1864) was a Dutch philologist and critic.  He was born in Leiden, and from 1817 to 1854 he was professor of Greek and Roman literature at the university.

His principal works are:-
Posidonii Rhodii Reliquiae Doctrinae (1810)
Cleomedis Circularis Doctrina de Sublimitate (1820)
Bibliotheca Critica Nova (1825–1831)
Scholica Hypomnemata (1837–1862), a collection of essays dealing mainly with Cicero and the Attic orators
Cicero, De Legibus (1842) and De Oratore (1863)
Apsinis et Longini Rhethorica (1849).

His biography was written (in Dutch) by his pupil Bakhuizen van der Brink (1865); for an appreciation of his services to classical literature see L Müller, Geschichte der klassischen Philologie in den Nederlanden (1869).

References

1787 births
1864 deaths
Dutch philologists
Linguists from the Netherlands
People from Leiden